OS8, OS 8, or OS/8 may refer to:

 Mac OS 8, an operating system for the Apple Macintosh
 iOS 8, the eighth version of the iOS operating system
 OS/8, an operating system used on the PDP-8 minicomputer

See also
 System 8 (disambiguation)